Moses Dani Baah is a Ghanaian politician and was the Member of Parliament for the Sissala East constituency in the Upper West Region of Ghana. He was a member of the People's National Convention.

Early life and education 
Baah was born in July, 1951. He attended the Kwame Nkrumah University of Science and Technology (KNUST). From KNUST he obtained a Diploma in Civil Engineering.

Career 
Baah is a Site Engineer by profession.

Politics 
Baah was elected the Member of parliament for the Sissala East constituency, formerly Sissala constituency in the Upper West region of Ghana. He represented the constituency in the 4th parliament of the 4th republic of Ghana.

2000 Elections 
Baah was elected as the member of parliament for the constituency in the Upper West region of Ghana in the 2000 Ghanaian general elections. He therefore represented the constituency in the 4th parliament of the 4th republic of Ghana. He was elected with 16,009 votes out of the total votes cast.

This is equivalent to 55.40% of the total valid votes cast. He was elected over Amidu Sulemana of the National Democratic Congress Party, Lamini M. Dawudu of the New Patriotic Party and Issah Musah of the United Ghana Movement.

These obtained 12,046 votes, 632 votes and 219 votes respectively of the total valid votes cast. These were equivalent to 41.70%, 2.20% and 0.80% respectively of the total valid votes cast. Baah was elected on the ticket of the Peoples National Convention.

Baah was elected as the member of parliament for the Sissala East constituency in the 2004 Ghanaian general elections. He, therefore, represented the constituency in the 4th parliament of the 4th republic of Ghana from 7 January 2005 to 6 January 2009.

He was elected with 14,186 votes out of 19,129 total valid votes cast. He was elected over Alhassan Dubie Halutie of the National Democratic Congress. Baah was elected on the ticket of the People's National Convention.

His constituency was a part of the only two constituencies won by the People's National Convention in the Upper West region of Ghana in the 2004 Ghanaian General elections. The electorates in the Sissala East constituency voted in a 'skirt and blouse' manner in that elections as the presidential candidate who won for the same constituency was John Kuffour of the New Patriotic Party.

In all the party won just 4 parliamentary representation out of a total 230 seats in the 4th parliament of the 4th republic of Ghana.

References 

1951 births
Living people
Ghanaian MPs 2001–2005
Ghanaian MPs 2005–2009
Kwame Nkrumah University of Science and Technology alumni